American Outlaws is a 2001 American Western alternate history film directed by Les Mayfield and starring Colin Farrell, Scott Caan, and Ali Larter.

Plot
Confederate guerillas attempt to raid the Union Army late in the American Civil War. The guerillas are ambushed, but thanks to the sharp-shooting of Frank James and the distractions of his brother Jesse they survive. The James, along with their buddies, the Younger brothers, congratulate themselves but learn that the Confederacy has pulled out of the war and it is over. The group decides to return to Missouri to their families and farms.

When they arrive, their town is occupied by the Union Army. Jesse's childhood friend Zee has grown into an attractive young woman, and there is a man hanging in the town square. Farmers are being pressured to sell their farms to the railroad company, who are pushing across the United States. If they don't sell their land to Thaddeus Rains, and his secret-service organizer, Allan Pinkerton, the farmers are burned out of their homes, or killed.

Frank finds the railroad doesn't even need their land. The James and Younger brothers don't want to sell, and Cole Younger loses his temper when several railroad men approach him about selling and kills two of them. The army decides to hang him, but his brothers Bob and Jim, along with Jesse, Frank, and Zee, decide to rescue him. During the rescue, Jesse is shot in the shoulder, and hides out at Zee's.

A few weeks later, when Jesse has recovered, the railroad sets fire to the James' home, killing Jesse's mother. The James and Younger brothers ride out for revenge against the railroad men but instead focus on the bank's payroll, reasoning that if they steal the money and attack supply trains, the army will notice. Dubbing themselves the James–Younger Gang, they set out robbing banks, with Pinkerton and Rains struggling to stop them. The James gang turns themselves into folk heroes in the process.

The gang struggles over leadership, with Cole feeling that Jesse is getting an overblown ego from the publicity of the gang's activities. Jesse backs down, after an argument, and lets Cole plan and execute a robbery; Cole's chosen target proves to be a trap set by Pinkerton and Rains. Jim is shot and killed, and Jesse and his brother leave the gang, with Jesse later marrying Zee.

The gang does not do well without the James'. People do not respect the Younger brothers as much as they did the James-Younger Gang. When Jesse and Zee attempt to start a new life, Pinkerton finds and arrests Jesse. During the train ride to the jail, Jesse is chained in a rear car, but tricks a deputy into showing his gun, which he takes from him and uses to escape to the top of the train car.

Zee and the remainder of the Gang shoot a cannon at the train, stopping it and rescuing Jesse. Confronted with Rains and Pinkerton, Jesse shoots neither of them but rather Rains' prized watch. Pinkerton tells Jesse that he should go to Tennessee, as 'the railroad has no interest in Tennessee'.

Cast

Home media
The film was released on VHS and DVD on December 4, 2001.

Reception

American Outlaws opened to dismal box office and mostly negative reviews. Many critics cited a poor sense of time and place as a major cause of the film's problems. Others just dismissed the film as another Young Guns ripoff.

On Rotten Tomatoes the film has a 14% approval rating based on 103 reviews, with an average rating of 3.7/10. The website's critics consensus reads: "With corny dialogue, revisionist history, anachronistic music, and a generically attractive cast, American Outlaws is a sanitized, teenybopper version of Jesse James". On Metacritic it has a score of 25% based on reviews from 26 critics, indicating "generally unfavorable reviews".

Roger Ebert of the Chicago Sun-Times wrote: "For years there have been reports of the death of the Western. Now comes American Outlaws, proof that even the B Western is dead."	 Robert Koehler of Variety said the film "sadly symbolizes the decline of the Western. The 36th bigscreen version of the exploits of the James-Younger Gang is one of the least convincing."

Kevin Thomas of the Los Angeles Times gave it a positive review and called it "a handsome and skillful retelling of a legend that imaginatively draws on conventions of both the western and the gangster movie to create an energetic yet thoughtful contemporary action-adventure."

References

External links 

 
 

2001 films
2001 Western (genre) films
American Civil War films
Biographical films about Jesse James
Cultural depictions of Allan Pinkerton
Films directed by Les Mayfield
Films with screenplays by John Rogers
Films scored by Trevor Rabin
Films set in 1865
Morgan Creek Productions films
Warner Bros. films
American Western (genre) films
2000s English-language films
2000s American films